is a Japanese manga written and illustrated by Yuuya. It is licensed in North America by Digital Manga Publishing, which released the manga through its June imprint, on May 13, 2008.

Reception
Danielle Van Gorder felt the plot had "some of the least believable characters or situations I've read, lame plot devices, and what is quite possibly the most contrived ending ever to grace a BL book" and that the translation "was plagued with stilted lines", but praised Yuuya's "slick and polished" art, feeling that the art was the only reason to recommend Endless Rain. Holly Ellingwood, writing for Active Anime, praised the character designs, saying that they "immediately capture one's attention", and noted the "heady emotional content" of the manga, and "incendiary" explicit scenes. Leroy felt the manga would "appeal to one's prurient interests", while noting the author's "deep character drama".

References

External links
 

Drama anime and manga
2006 manga
Yaoi anime and manga
Digital Manga Publishing titles